Alexander Fraser (January 18, 1786 – November 12, 1853) was a soldier and political figure in Upper Canada.

He was born in Glendoemore, near Fort Augustus, Scotland in 1786. He joined the Canadian Fencibles in Scotland in 1803 and came to Quebec with them in 1805. He served as quartermaster with them during the War of 1812. In 1816, he settled in Charlottenburgh Township in Glengarry County. He called his farm, located near Williamstown, Fraserfield. He was a co-founder of the Highland Society of Canada in 1818. In 1820, he was appointed justice of the peace in the Eastern District. In 1828, he was elected to the 10th Parliament of Upper Canada representing Glengarry County. In 1836, he became registrar for the county.

He commanded a regiment of the Glengarry militia during the rebellion of 1837–38 in Lower Canada. In 1839, he became a member of the Legislative Council. In 1841, he became a legislative councillor for the province of Canada and he was appointed the first warden of the Eastern District. He opposed the Rebellion Losses Bill of 1849 and lobbied to ensure that the old Eastern District remained intact in 1849 as the United Counties of Stormont, Dundas and Glengarry.

He died at Fraserfield in 1853.

External links 
Biography at the Dictionary of Canadian Biography Online

1786 births
1853 deaths
Members of the Legislative Assembly of Upper Canada
Members of the Legislative Council of Upper Canada
Members of the Legislative Council of the Province of Canada
People from the United Counties of Stormont, Dundas and Glengarry
People from Highland (council area)
Scottish emigrants to pre-Confederation Ontario
Immigrants to Upper Canada
Canadian justices of the peace